Route 34 is a highway in southeastern Missouri.  Its eastern terminus is at the Illinois state line on the Mississippi River at Cape Girardeau where it overlaps Route 74.  Its western terminus is at U.S. Route 60 near Van Buren.  The road continues into Illinois as Illinois Route 146.

Route 34 is one of the original 1922 state highways.  Its original eastern terminus was at Jackson. 

Spur Route 34 exists in Jackson.

Major intersections

References

034
Transportation in Carter County, Missouri
Transportation in Reynolds County, Missouri
Transportation in Wayne County, Missouri
Transportation in Bollinger County, Missouri
Transportation in Cape Girardeau County, Missouri